Szabina Tápai (born 30 January 1986 in Kiskunhalas) is a Hungarian handballer who most recently played for Szent István SE in the second league. In 2016 she decided to retire from professional handball due to an argument with her coach, Rita Deli. Her coach did not like the fact, that Tápai and her family were taking part in a reality show beside other media appearances. One year later she joined the team of Szent István SE. In 2018 she announced her retirement from handball and pregnancy at the same time.

Achievements
Magyar Kupa:
Silver Medalist: 2006
EHF Cup:
Winner: 2005
Youth European Championship:
Bronze Medalist: 2003

Awards and recognitions
 Hungarian Junior Handballer of the Year: 2004

Personal life
She is married, her husband is Gábor Kucsera, two time world champion canoeist. She gave birth to their son, Bence in October 2013. Their daughter, Milla was born in November 2018.

References

External links

 
 Career statistics at Worldhandball

1986 births
Living people
People from Kiskunhalas
Hungarian female handball players
Expatriate handball players
Hungarian expatriates in Denmark
Hungarian expatriates in France
Sportspeople from Bács-Kiskun County